Diplatyidae is a family of earwigs in the suborder Neodermaptera. It contains three subfamilies, and four genera incertae sedis, one modern and three extinct known from fossils.

Taxonomy
Subfamilies and genera as listed at the Dermaptera species file:
subfamily Cylindrogastrinae Maccagno, 1929
 Cylindrogaster Stal, 1855

Diplatyinae
Authority: Verhoeff, 1902
 Circodiplatys Steinmann, 1986
 Diplatyella Gorokhov & Anisyutkin, 1994
 Diplatys Audinet-Serville, 1831
 Eudiplatys Steinmann, 1986
 Mesodiplatys Steinmann, 1986
 Nannopygia Dohrn, 1862
 Paradiplatys Zacher, 1910

Diplatymorphinae
Authority: V Boeseman, 1954
 Diplatymorpha Boeseman, 1954

Genera incertae sedis
 †Acanthodiplatys Ren, Zhang, Shih & Ren, 2018: monotypic A. leptocercus Ren, Zhang, Shih & Ren, 2018
 †Hirtidiplatys Ren, Zhang, Shih & Ren, 2018: monotypic H. cardiophyllus Ren, Zhang, Shih & Ren, 2018
 Songmaella Gorokhov & Anisyutkin, 1994: monotypic S. princeps Gorokhov & Anisyutkin, 1994
 †Tytthodiplatys Engel, 2011
The genus Tytthodiplatys was described in 2011 from a fossil found in Burmese amber which dates to the Albian age of the Cretaceous.  It was not placed into the subfamily Diplatyinae, and is the oldest confirmed member of the family.

References

External links 
 The Earwig Research Centre's Diplatyidae database Source for references: type Diplatyidae in the "family" field and click "search".

Dermaptera families
Forficulina
Taxa named by Karl Wilhelm Verhoeff